Edward Christian "Ed" Sullivan (born April 1934) is a Democratic Party politician from Manhattan who represented the Upper West Side's 69th district in the New York State Assembly from 1977 to 2002.

Biography
Sullivan was born in Springfield, Massachusetts. A resident of New York City since 1957, Sullivan attended the Sorbonne in Paris, and graduated from the New School University in 1968 with a M.A. in Political Science.

Fluent in French, he used his language skills to help others adjust to their new society, teaching English as a Second Language for 15 years at New York University, City University of New York, and other institutions.

Eventually, his passion for education led him to activism and advocacy — and a run for the New York State Assembly. He was a member of the New York State Assembly from 1977 to 2002, sitting in the 182nd, 183rd, 184th, 185th, 186th, 187th, 188th, 189th, 190th, 191st, 192nd, 193rd and 194th New York State Legislatures. While there, he served for a time as Chairman of the Higher Education Committee.

Sullivan is the father of actress/comedian Nicole Sullivan, who appeared on MADtv as well as on The King of Queens, Kim Possible, The Penguins of Madagascar.

References
Metro Briefing - New York: Manhattan: Assemblyman To Retire New York Times March 5, 2002. Retrieved June 10, 2022
Alumni Hall of Distinction - Commission on Independent Colleges and Universities

1934 births
Living people
University of Paris alumni
New York University faculty
City University of New York faculty
People from the Upper West Side
Members of the New York State Assembly
Politicians from Springfield, Massachusetts
American expatriates in France